Kalyan Ghosh (born 4 November 1946) is an Indian former cricketer. He played ten first-class matches for Bengal between 1964 and 1971.

See also
 List of Bengal cricketers

References

External links
 

1946 births
Living people
Indian cricketers
Bengal cricketers
Cricketers from Kolkata